Danaus affinis, the Malay tiger, mangrove tiger or swamp tiger, is a butterfly found in tropical Asia. It belongs to the "crows and tigers", the danaine group of the brush-footed butterflies family.

This is a highly variable species. In its range, which stretches from Thailand to the Philippines and southwards through Indonesia to Melanesia and northeastern Australia, it has at least around 30, possibly many more subspecies. Its closest relative is the white tiger, Danaus melanippus.

See also
Danainae
Nymphalidae
List of butterflies of India
List of butterflies of India (Nymphalidae)

References

Danaus (butterfly)
Butterflies of Australia
Butterflies of Indonesia
Butterflies described in 1775
Butterflies of Asia
Taxa named by Johan Christian Fabricius